Hasnain Siddiq Malik (born 21 April 1973) is a Pakistani businessman and former first-class cricketer.

Malik was born at Sargodha in August 1973. He was schooled in England at King's College School, before going up to Keble College, Oxford. While studying at Oxford, he played first-class cricket for Oxford University, making his debut against Lancashire in 1992. He played first-class cricket for Oxford until 1996, making a total of 33 appearances. Malik scored 748 runs in his 33 matches, at an average of 20.77 and a high score of 64 not out, one of four half centuries he made. With his off break bowling, he took 30 wickets at an expensive bowling average of 70.26 and best figures of 3 for 10, which came against Hampshire in a rain affected match at Oxford.

After graduating from Oxford, Malik went into business.

References

External links

1973 births
Living people
People from Sargodha
People educated at King's College School, London
Alumni of Keble College, Oxford
Pakistani cricketers
Oxford University cricketers
Pakistani businesspeople